Puhar may refer to:

People
 Alenka Puhar (born 1945), Slovenian journalist
 Janez Puhar (1814-1864), Slovene priest, also known as Johann Pucher
 Janko Puhar (1920-1985), Yugoslav swimmer
 Mirjana Puhar, competitor in America's Next Top Model (season 21)
 Rok Puhar (born 1992), Slovenian long distance runner

Places
 Puhar, Nagapattinam, Tamil Nadu, India